Killer 77, Alive or Dead is a 1966 Italian-Spanish Eurospy film  directed by Mino Guerrini and starring Rod Dana.

Cast 

  Rod Dana 	as Lester (credited as Robert Mark)
  	Alicia Brandet 		as Minnie 
 John Stacy 	as Lester's Chief
 José Bódalo 	as George King
 Mónica Randall 	 	as Bárbara
 Armando Calvo as Mr. Heep
 María Badmajew 	as "Madame" 
  Sonja Romanoff 	 
 Demofilo Fidani 	as King's Lawyer
 Luciano Rossi 	as Dr. Krauss 
 Antonio Casale

Reception
The Italian film critic Marco Giusti describes the film as "complex, visually well constructed, never boring." The film bombed at the Italian box office, grossing about 21 million lire.

References

External links

1966 films
1960s spy thriller films
Italian spy thriller films
Spanish spy thriller films
Films directed by Mino Guerrini
1960s Italian films
1960s Spanish films